Jon Whittle (born 9 September 1982) is a former professional rugby union and rugby league footballer who played in the 2000s.

Playing career

Club career
Jon Whittle made his début for Featherstone Rovers on Sunday 11 February 2007.

References

External links
Statistics at rugby.widnes.tv

1982 births
English rugby league players
Featherstone Rovers players
Living people
Place of birth missing (living people)
Rugby league centres
Rugby league wingers
Wakefield Trinity players
Widnes Vikings players
Wigan Warriors players